Oliver Janso (born 8 October 1993) is a Slovak professional footballer who plays for Slovak club ŠKF Sereď as a left-back.

Club career

Spartak Trnava
Janso made his league debut for Spartak Trnava against Senica on 24 September 2016.

Honours 
Spartak Trnava
 Fortuna Liga: 2017–18

References

External links
 FC Spartak Trnava official club profile
 
 Futbalnet profile

1993 births
Living people
People from Myjava
Sportspeople from the Trenčín Region
Slovak footballers
Slovak expatriate footballers
Association football defenders
FK Senica players
AFC Nové Mesto nad Váhom players
SC Ritzing players
FC Slovan Galanta players
FC Spartak Trnava players
FK Ústí nad Labem players
Partizán Bardejov players
KFC Komárno players
Slovak Super Liga players
2. Liga (Slovakia) players
Czech National Football League players
III liga players
Slovak expatriate sportspeople in the Czech Republic
Slovak expatriate sportspeople in Austria
Slovak expatriate sportspeople in Poland
Expatriate footballers in the Czech Republic
Expatriate footballers in Austria
Expatriate footballers in Poland